Emmanouela Athanasiadi (born 3 April 1965) is a Greek equestrian. She competed in two events at the 2004 Summer Olympics.

References

External links
 

1965 births
Living people
Greek female equestrians
Olympic equestrians of Greece
Equestrians at the 2004 Summer Olympics
Place of birth missing (living people)
21st-century Greek women